Ben Monder (born May 24, 1962) is an American modern jazz guitarist.

Biography
Monder started playing guitar when he was eleven, after two years on violin. From 1979–84, he attended the Westchester Conservatory of Music, the University of Miami, and Queens College. One of his early jobs was in 1986 when he performed with Jack McDuff.

In 1995 he recorded his debut album, Flux, featuring drummer Jim Black and bassist Drew Gress.  This was followed by the trio recording Dust (1996) and the quartet recording Excavation (2000) which added vocalist Theo Bleckmann. Bloom, a 2001 recording (an improvisation recorded in a single day) with saxophone player Bill McHenry, wasn't released until 2010. In between, he released Oceana (2005), a genre-bending solo album, and The Distance (2006), an album with pianist Chris Gestrin and drummer Dylan van der Schyff. In 2007, he recorded At Night with Theo Bleckmann and drummer Satoshi Takeishi. In 2013, Monder released Hydra on Sunnyside, featuring Bleckmann, John Pattitucci, Skúli Sverrisson, and Ted Poor. He made his debut on ECM Records as a leader with 2016's Amorphae, and played guitar on David Bowie's final studio album, Blackstar (2016).

He has worked with Lee Konitz, David Bowie, Paul Motian, Chris Cheek, Tim Berne, David Binney, Theo Bleckmann, George Garzone, Jon Gordon, Julie Hardy, John Hollenbeck, Marc Johnson, Frank Kimbrough, Guillermo Klein, Dave Liebman, Michael Leonhart, Rebecca Martin, Donny McCaslin, Bill McHenry, Charles Pillow, Tim Ries, Pete Robbins, Josh Roseman, Maria Schneider, Kendra Shank, Toots Thielemans, Kenny Wheeler, Dan Willis, Miguel Zenón, and Patrick Zimmerli.

From 2002–2005, he taught at the New England Conservatory. As of August, 2021 he is a member of the Minneapolis-based jazz quartet The Bad Plus.

Discography

As leader
 Flux (Songlines, 1995)
 Dust (Arabesque, 1997)
 Excavation (Arabesque, 2000)
 Oceana (Sunnyside, 2005)
 Hydra (Sunnyside, 2013)
 Amorphae (ECM, 2016)
 Day After Day (Sunnyside, 2019)

As co-leader
 No Boat with Theo Bleckmann (Songlines, 1997)
 At Night with Theo Bleckmann (Songlines, 2007)
 Bloom with Bill McHenry (Sunnyside, 2010)

with The Bad Plus
 The Bad Plus. (Edition, 2022)

As sideman
With Theo Bleckmann
 Origami (Songlines, 2001)
 Elegy (ECM, 2017)

With Guillermo Klein
 Los Guachos II (Sunnyside, 1999)
 Los Guachos III (Sunnyside, 2002)
 Live In Bareclona (Fresh Sound, 2005)
 Filtros (Sunnyside, 2008)
 Carrera (Sunnyside, 2012)
 Los Guachos V (Sunnyside, 2016)
 Cristal (Sunnyside, 2019)

With Donny McCaslin
 Seen from Above (Arabesque, 2000)
 Soar (Sunnyside, 2006)
 In Pursuit (Sunnyside, 2007)
 Declaration (Sunnyside, 2009)
 Blow (Motema, 2018)

With Bill McHenry
 Rest Stop (Fresh Sound, 1998)
 Graphic (Fresh Sound, 1999)
 Featuring Paul Motian (Fresh Sound, 2003)
 Roses (Sunnyside, 2007)
 Ghosts of the Sun (Sunnyside, 2011)

With Paul Motian
 Europe (Winter & Winter, 2001)
 Holiday for Strings (Winter & Winter, 2002)
 Garden of Eden (ECM, 2006)

With Noah Preminger
 Dry Bridge Road (Nowt, 2008)
 Haymaker (Palmetto, 2013)
 Some Other Time (Newvelle, 2016)

With Maria Schneider
 Evanescence (Enja, 1994)
 Coming About (Enja, 1996)
 Allegresse (ArtistShare, 2000)
 Days of Wine and Roses (ArtistShare, 2000)
 Concert in the Garden (ArtistShare, 2004)
 Sky Blue (ArtistShare, 2007)
 Data Lords (ArtistShare, 2020)

With Patrick Zimmerli
 Explosion (Songlines, 1997)
 Expansion (Songlines, 2000)
 The Book of Hours (Songlines, 2002)

With others
 Pablo Ablanedo, Alegria (Fresh Sound, 2003)
 David Ake, Humanities (Posi-Tone, 2018)
 Reid Anderson, The Vastness of Space (Fresh Sound, 2000)
 David Binney, The Luxury of Guessing (AudioQuest, 1995)
 David Bowie, Blackstar (Columbia, 2015)
 Chris Cheek, A Girl Name Joe (Fresh Sound, 1998)
 Gerald Cleaver, Adjust (Fresh Sound, 2001)
 Dave's True Story, Sex Without Bodies (Chesky, 1998)
 Yelena Eckemoff, Better Than Gold and Silver (L&H, 2018)
 Jon Gordon, Currents (Double-Time, 1998)
 Drew Gress, Heyday (Soul Note, 1998)
 Nikolaj Hess, Global Motion + (Stunt, 2010)
 John Hollenbeck, No Images (Composers Recordings, 2001)
 Ingrid Jensen, Infinitude (Whirlwind, 2016)
 Marc Johnson, Right Brain Patrol (JMT, 1992)
 Frank Kimbrough, Noumena (Soul Note, 2000)
 Steve LaSpina, Distant Dream (Steeplechase, 1998)
 Rebecca Martin, People Behave Like Ballads (Maxjazz, 2004)
 Dan McCarthy, Epoch (Origin, 2019)
 Francisco Mela, Tree of Life (Half Note, 2011)
 Andy Milne, Forward in All Directions (Contrology 2014)
 Andy Milne, The Seasons of Being (Sunnyside, 2018)
 Dave Pietro, Forgotten Dreams (A Records, 1994)
 Mika Pohjola, Landmark (Abovoice, 2002)
 Mika Pohjola, Northern Sunrise (BlueMusicGroup 2009)
 Bruno Raberg, Lifelines (Orbis Music, 2008)
 Tim Ries, Alternate Side (Criss Cross, 2001)
 Tim Ries, The Rolling Stones Project (Concord, 2005)
 Pete Robbins, Do The Hate Laugh Shimmy (Fresh Sound, 2008)
 Josh Roseman, Cherry (Enja, 2000)
 Josh Roseman, Treats for the Nightwalker (Enja, 2003)
 Kendra Shank, A Spirit Free: Abbey Lincoln Songbook (Challenge, 2006)
 Kendra Shank, Mosaic (Challenge, 2009)
 Jeremy Udden, Torchsongs (Fresh Sound, 2006)
 Andre White, Signal (Cornerstone, 2000)
 Miguel Zenon, Looking Forward (Fresh Sound, 2001)

References

External links
Official site

1962 births
Living people
Guitarists from New York City
University of Miami alumni
American jazz guitarists
Avant-garde jazz musicians
Arabesque Records artists
20th-century American guitarists
Jazz musicians from New York (state)
Octurn members
Sunnyside Records artists